Michael D. Robbins is an American author, psychoanalyst, and former professor of Psychiatry at Harvard Medical School and the University of California, San Francisco. His psychoanalytic research has focused on how the mind works in western and non-western cultures, particularly with regard to schizophrenia and other psychoses, language, creativity, conscious and unconscious mental processes.

Biography
Robbins graduated from Amherst College Summa Cum Laude in 1955. He received his medical degree at Columbia University College of Physicians & Surgeons. Robbins completed his residency at Massachusetts Mental Health Center and an internship at the University of Rochester Medical School. Additionally, he graduated from and is a member of the Boston Psychoanalytic Society and Institute.

Robbins joined Harvard Medical School where he became an assistant professor and later a clinical professor of Psychiatry. He was attending psychiatrist at McLean Hospital in Belmont, Massachusetts where he was in charge of wards and then became director of the admissions and brief treatment service. He later became clinical professor of psychiatry at the University of California, San Francisco and was on the faculty of the Psychoanalytic Institute of Northern California.

He is a member of the International Psychoanalytic Association, and the American Psychoanalytic Association. He was on the board of directors of the American Academy of Psychoanalysis and the International Society for the Psychological Treatment of Schizophrenia and Other Psychoses (ISPS).

In 1983, Robbins received the Felix and Helene Deutsch Prize presented by the Boston Psychoanalytic Society and Institute for his paper, "Toward a New Mind Model for the Primitive Personalities."

Selected bibliography

Books
 
 
 
 Michael Robbins (May 5, 2018).  Consciousness, Language, and Self: Psychoanalytic Explorations of the Dual Nature of Mind.  Routledge. .
Michael Robbins (April 2019). Psychoanalysis Meets Psychosis: Attachment, Separation,,and the Undifferentiated Unintegrated Mind. Routledge. .

Book chapters

Articles
 
 
 
 
 
 
 
 
 
 M Robbins (2015).  "The “royal road” – to what?"  The Annual of Psychoanalysis. 38: 196-214.
 M.Robbins (2018). "The Primary Process: Freud's Profound but Neglected Contribution to the Psychology of Consciousness".  Psychoanalytic Inquiry. 38: 186-197.

References

Living people
American non-fiction writers
Harvard Medical School faculty
University of California, San Francisco faculty
American psychoanalysts
Amherst College alumni
20th-century American scientists
21st-century American scientists
21st-century American male writers
20th-century American male writers
Year of birth missing (living people)
McLean Hospital physicians
Male non-fiction writers